Filin-class guard ships were a class of ships originally built in Finland as patrol vessels for the Imperial Russian Navy. With the withdrawal of Russia from the area, the ships went to other use.

Overview
Four ships were constructed, two of them were sold to Polish Navy where they served as General Haller and Komendant Piłsudski and the other two were commissioned into the Finnish Navy as Turunmaa and Karjala.

They were initially classified as patrol cruisers though the name did not describe them well. The class had good accommodation for a their size but they hardly resembled a warship. Foreign observers' comments on the ships of the class in Finnish service was that they were 'graceful tugs'. The ships were only suitable for coastal patrolling as they were not particularly seaworthy and their structural strength and power were limited. Also the structure did not allow guns larger than 75 mm to be installed.

Ships in class

Last two ships of the same class - Gorlitsa and Sova - were being constructed before the work on them was halted. They were never completed and instead were scrapped.

References

Gunboats
Naval ships of Finland
Naval ships of Poland
Gunboat classes
Patrol boat classes